Apples and honey are a traditional dish served by Ashkenazi Jews on Rosh Hashanah, the Jewish New Year's Day and the beginning of the High Holidays.

History
Dipping apples into honey as a celebratory dish and ceremony for Rosh Hashanah likely originated with the Ancient Israelites.

Overview
Apples and honey consists of raw apples sliced and served with a separate dish of honey. A blessing is said in Hebrew over the apples and honey, to ask for a “Sweet New Year”, and the apple is then dipped into the honey and eaten. Dipping apples in honey is a minhag and is not dictated by the Tanakh or the Talmud.

In American-Jewish Culture
Ahead of Rosh Hashanah in English-speaking Ashkenazic schools, young schoolchildren learn the "dip the apple in the honey" song (to the tune of Oh My Darling, Clementine).

See also 
Rosh Hashanah seder
Jewish cuisine

References

Ashkenazi Jewish cuisine
Jewish culture
Rosh Hashanah foods